Day Off is a Philippine television reality show broadcast by GMA News TV. The show awards people with a day off from their job. Originally hosted by Pekto and Carmina Villarroel, it premiered from November 12, 2005. The show concluded on May 25, 2019 with a total of 746 episodes. Janine Gutierrez and Ken Chan served as the final hosts.

Hosts
 Janine Gutierrez
 Ken Chan

Co-hosts
 Jason Francisco
 Dasuri Choi
 Boobay
 Maey Bautista

Former hosts
 Carmina Villarroel 
 Pekto 
 Isabel Oli
 Bela Padilla
 Julie Anne San Jose

Accolades

References

2005 Philippine television series debuts
2019 Philippine television series endings
Filipino-language television shows
GMA Integrated News and Public Affairs shows
GMA News TV original programming
Philippine reality television series
Q (TV network) original programming